is a Japanese footballer who plays as a midfielder for Zweigen Kanazawa in the J2 League.

Career

Ventforet Kofu
Kaneko played his professional debut for Ventforet Kofu in the J. League Division 1 on 2 March 2013 against Vegalta Sendai in which he played for 67 minutes before he was substituted by Akito Kawamoto as Ventforet drew the match 1–1.

Career statistics

Club
Updated to end of 2018 season.

References

External links 
Profile at Zweigen Kanazawa

 
 

1991 births
Living people
Kokushikan University alumni
Association football people from Saitama Prefecture
Japanese footballers
J1 League players
J2 League players
J3 League players
Ventforet Kofu players
Zweigen Kanazawa players
Association football midfielders
People from Tokorozawa, Saitama